Vito Knežević (born 25 January 1956) is a retired Swedish football defender who played most of his career for Allsvenskan club Djurgårdens IF.

Born in SFR Yugoslavia, Knežević came to Sweden with his family in 1960. The family settled in the city of Borås. Knežević began playing for Norrby IF and was considered to be one of Sweden's biggest talents when Djurgårdens IF paid 250,000 kronor and signed him in 1977. Knežević began his career as a sweeper, but later learned to play as both wingback and winger. He was best known for his tough style of playing. He represented the Sweden U19 and U21 teams.

References

1956 births
Association football defenders
Living people
Djurgårdens IF Fotboll players
People from Borås
Swedish footballers
Yugoslav emigrants to Sweden
Norrby IF players
Allsvenskan players